"Sweetheart" is a 1981 song by Franke and the Knockouts. It was their debut single and greatest hit, reaching the U.S. Top 10 during the spring of that year.

Background
The song was the group's first of three U.S. Top 40 hits, the others being "You're My Girl" (#27) and "Without You (Not Another Lonely Night)" (#24).

Chart history
It spent 19 weeks on the charts and is ranked as the 50th biggest hit of 1981."Sweetheart" also charted moderately on both the U.S. Adult Contemporary and Mainstream Rock charts. Internationally, "Sweetheart" charted only in Canada (#18).

Weekly charts

Year-end charts

References

External links
 Lyrics of this song
  

1981 songs
1981 debut singles
Franke and the Knockouts songs
Songs written by Franke Previte
Millennium Records singles